Rough Rider is a documentary film, first shown on RTÉ television on 28 July 2014. Filmed over two years, it is set against the fall of Lance Armstrong for doping offences in 2012 and follows the Irish journalist and former professional cyclist Paul Kimmage during the 2013 Tour de France, where he questions what is being done to free professional cycling from doping since the release in 1990 of his book Rough Ride. The film is directed by Adrian McCarthy.

References

External links
Rough Rider at RTE

RTÉ original programming
2010s in Irish television
Documentary films about cycling
Irish documentary television films
2014 television films
2014 films
2013 Tour de France
Tour de France mass media
Doping at the Tour de France
Films about doping
2010s English-language films
English-language Irish films